Robotica is a robot combat show (similar to the early seasons of Robot Wars) produced for the American television cable channel TLC, a subsidiary of the Discovery Channel, from April 4, 2001, to November 16, 2002. Ahmet Zappa and Tanya Memme hosted all three seasons while Tanika Ray only hosted the first season with Dan Danknick replacing her for the second and third seasons.

Season 1
Each preliminary show in the first season of Robotica featured four robots weighing as much as 210 pounds paired off in a series of three challenges. The winners of each pairing faced each other in a Robot-sumo style "Fight to the Finish" to determine the winner of the show.

The first challenge was The Speedway. Robots raced in opposite directions around a figure-8 track. Robots were awarded 10 points for each lap completed (up to 8), with an additional 20 points awarded to the winner. This challenge had a two-minute time limit. While only occurring a few times, going out of bounds would incur a 10-point penalty.
The second challenge was The Maze. Robots negotiated obstacles in two identical, twisting courses that met in the middle. Five obstacles (teeter ramp, push box, rotating paddles, guillotine, and waterfall) worth 15 points each, plus 25 points for the first robot to the center platform. This challenge had a three-minute time limit, and if both robots got stuck at an obstacle when time ran out, they would earn points based on the obstacles they cleared up to that point.
The third challenge was The Gauntlet. Robots crashed through barrier walls of increasing difficulty. Five barriers (glass pane, paint cans filled with sand, bricks, concrete paving stones, and a heavy safe) worth 15 points each, plus 25 points to the first robot to complete the course. This challenge had a three-minute time limit and like the Maze, if time ran out with both robots stuck, their score would be based on how many barriers they cleared up to that point.

Total points were added for the three events to determine a winner. In the event of a tie, the robot who won the greater number of events advanced.

The Fight to The Finish took place on a 16' by 16' platform elevated high above the floor. A low guard rail surrounded the platform for the first minute and then fell away. The last robot on the platform moved on to the finals.

The finals worked the same way as the preliminary shows, except there were six robots, competing in three pairs. Three robots met in the Fight to the Finish.  The winner of the show was awarded the largest cash prize in robot combat to that date: $12,000.

Competitors and results
Heat 1: Killer B (heat runner-up) vs. Mini Inferno (lost preliminary round)/Run Amok (heat winner, season winner) vs. Spring Breaker (lost preliminary round)
Heat 2: Kritical Mass (heat winner, lost prelims in finals) vs. Grimlock (lost preliminary round)/Boelter Beast (lost preliminary round) vs. Hot Wheels (heat runner-up)
Heat 3: Wendingo (heat runner-up) vs. i-Droid (lost preliminary round)/Crisis Management (lost preliminary round) vs. Jaw Breaker (heat winner, lost prelim in finals)
Heat 4: Ram Force (heat winner, 2nd place in finals) vs. HandsOFF! (lost preliminary round)/Pandora's Bot (lost preliminary round) vs. Solar Flare (heat runner-up) 
Heat 5: Juggerbot (heat winner, 3rd place in finals) vs. Noll (withdrew following Speedway)/Hamerschlag (heat runner-up) vs. Krypler (lost preliminary round)
Heat 6: Panzer Mk 1 (heat runner-up) vs. Malvolio (lost preliminary round)/Viper (heat winner, lost prelim in finals) vs. Evil Beaver (lost preliminary round)

Seasons 2 and 3
Robotica seasons 2 and 3 featured redesigned challenges. The Speedway was eliminated, The Gauntlet was redesigned, and The Maze had been completely re-done and renamed The Labyrinth.

The former side-by-side Gauntlet course was now arranged in a diamond-shape. The first barrier wall was now a wooden plank, the walls of metal cans, bricks, and concrete paving stones remained, and the safe was gone. Each robot had to complete their own two legs of the diamond and then return through the opponent's rubble field before climbing a ramp up to the Forest of Glass in the center of the diamond. When all the glass strips were broken, a final glass sheet lowered as the final challenge. Scoring was 10 points for each barrier, 5 points for each rubble wall, 10 points for first up the ramp, 5 points for second up the ramp, 15 points for the final glass pane. This challenge had 150 total points available and a three-minute time limit.

The former two-path Maze was now a single Labyrinth wherein both robots could roam to choose from six scoring obstacles. Also roaming the Labyrinth were two rat-shaped robots named the "Robotica Rats" that could interfere with (or sometimes help) the competitors. Breaking the glass strip beyond each obstacle claimed the points. Obstacles were:
Push Box - 15 points
Lifting Spikes - 15 points
Suspension Bridge - 20 points
Flipper - 20 points
Rollers - 25 points
Sand Box - 25 points
Robots started together in a motorized rotating turntable, where combat was encouraged. While it only occurred once, a robot could be penalized the entire point total for an obstacle if they broke down or got stuck in a position that blocked access to the obstacle.

At the end of three minutes, or when all the obstacles were cleared, the exit opened. The final glass strip on the far side of the exit was worth 30 points. This challenge had 150 total points available and a four-minute time limit.

The winning pair of robots faced each other in The Fight to The Finish. The platform was enlarged from season 1; it was now a 25' by 25' elevated platform. A new rule called for robots to hold the other robot 'pinned' for no more than 15 seconds before release. A low guard rail surrounded the platform for the first minute, then fell away. The last robot on the platform moved on to the finals.

For the finals, three pairs of robots competed in The Gauntlet. The two robots with the lowest scores were eliminated, and the remaining four robots paired off for The Labyrinth. The two winning robots met in The Fight to The Finish to determine the champion.

Competitors and results

Season 2
Heat 1: Zero (heat runner-up) vs. KaNuckle Buster (lost preliminary round)/The Killa Gorilla (heat winner, eliminated in Gauntlet in finals) vs. Tetanus (lost preliminary round)
Heat 2: Fintastic! (lost preliminary round) vs. Scarab (heat runner-up)/TakaTakaTak (lost preliminary round) vs. Flexy Flyer (heat winner, season winner)
Heat 3: Armorgeddon (heat winner, eliminated in Gauntlet in finals) vs. Kraken (lost preliminary round)/Metalmorphis (heat runner-up) vs. Skewer Rat (lost preliminary round)
Heat 4: Whyatica (lost preliminary round) vs. Jav Man (heat runner-up)/IntriVerter (lost preliminary round) vs. Deb Bot (heat winner, eliminated in Labyrinth in finals)
Heat 5: Ill Tempered Mutt (heat winner, eliminated in Labyrinth in finals) vs. The Wizard of Sawz (lost preliminary round)/Shannonagains (lost preliminary round) vs. Mechacidal Maniac (heat runner-up)
Heat 6: Son of a Monkey's Wrench (lost preliminary round) vs. BotZilla (heat winner, season runner-up)/Northern Fury (lost preliminary round) vs. Thor (heat runner-up)

Season 3
Heat 1: Hammerhead (lost preliminary round) vs. Mini-Rip (heat winner, eliminated in Gauntlet in finals)/Pshhht! (heat runner-up) vs. Scrap 8.2 (lost preliminary round)
Heat 2: Jawbreaker's Revenge (heat winner, eliminated in Labyrinth in finals) vs. Buzz Bomb (lost preliminary round)/Pangolin (heat runner-up) vs. Nemo's Nemesis (lost preliminary round)
Heat 3: Panzer Mk III (heat winner, season winner) vs. Re-IntriVerter (lost preliminary round)/Terror (lost preliminary round) vs. Zeus (heat runner-up)
Heat 4: Rambot (heat winner, eliminated in Gauntlet in finals) vs. Dark Track (lost preliminary round)/Viper Rev. 2 (heat runner-up) vs. Particle Accelerator (lost preliminary round)
Heat 5: Denominator (lost preliminary round) vs. Juggerbot 3.0 (heat winner, season runner-up)/Da Claw (heat runner-up) vs. Logoseye (lost preliminary round)
Heat 6: Tiger Wood (heat runner-up) vs. The Tick (lost preliminary round)/Fury (lost preliminary round) vs. Ultra Violence (heat winner, eliminated in Labyrinth in finals)

Winning robots

Season 1: Run Amok
Season 2: 
Season 3: Panzer Mk. 3

See also
BattleBots
Robot combat
Robot Wars (TV series)
Robot-sumo

References

External links
 

2001 American television series debuts
2002 American television series endings
English-language television shows
Robot combat competitions
Robotics competitions
Television series about robots
Sports entertainment
TLC (TV network) original programming